Charles France (11 February 1879 – 18 October 1946) was a Scotland international rugby union player

Rugby union career

Amateur career
France played for Kelvinside Academicals.

Provincial career
He was capped by Glasgow District in 1898; scoring a try in the  Inter-City match against Edinburgh District.

International career
He was capped just the once for the Scotland international side, turning out against Ireland in 1903.

References

1879 births
1946 deaths
Glasgow District (rugby union) players
Kelvinside Academicals RFC players
Rugby union players from East Dunbartonshire
Scotland international rugby union players
Scottish rugby union players
Rugby union wings